Carl Frederick Kaestle (born March 27, 1940) is a Professor of Education, History, and Public Policy emeritus at Brown University. His historical research has focused on the development of American schools, particularly in the 1800s. He has worked at the University of Chicago and University of Wisconsin–Madison and is a former president of the National Academy of Education.

Early life
Carl Frederick Kaestle was born on March 27, 1940, in Schenectady, New York. He graduated with a B.A. from Yale in 1962, and with a master's and Ph.D. from Harvard in 1971.

Career
In 1970, Kaestle came to the University of Wisconsin–Madison and later became the William F. Vilas Research Professor in educational policy studies and history. He was the chair of Madison's educational policy studies department between 1978 and 1981. Towards the late 1980s, he had international renown as a historian of American education and literacy. His research has focused on the development of American schools, particularly in the 1800s. Kaestle co-founded the Center for the History of Print Culture in Modern America at the UW–Madison in 1992. He was the original chair of its advisory board, which gathered academics and librarians interested in print culture from across UW–Madison's campus.

In his 1983 Pillars of the Republic, Kaestle argued "... the eventual acceptance of state common-school systems was encouraged by Americans' commitment to republican government, by the dominance of native Protestant culture, and by the development of capitalism".

In 1995, Kaestle left the University of Wisconsin–Madison for the University of Chicago, and later became the University Professor and Professor of Education, History, and Public Policy emeritus at Brown University.  He wrote a book on the history of federal involvement in elementary and secondary education from 1940 to 1980.

Personal life
In 1997, Kaestle married Elizabeth Hollander (née Lynes) (1939–2015), the former commissioner of planning for the city of Chicago from 1983 until 1989, the first woman to serve in that post. Hollander was the daughter of Russell Lynes (1910–1991), the art historian, author and managing editor of Harper's Magazine and the niece of photographer George Platt Lynes (1907-1955).

Kaestle served as the former president of the National Academy of Education. Writing for The Journal of Interdisciplinary History, Harvey J. Graff declared Kaestle "one of the leading practitioners of American educational history". David Tyack referred to Kaestle's Pillars of the Republic as "the best interpretation of antebellum school development written thus far."

References 
Notes

Sources

 

Harvard Graduate School of Education alumni
Brown University faculty
American historians of education
Scholars of American education
Living people
1940 births
Yale University alumni